Daniel LaDrew Vranes (born October 29, 1958) is an American retired professional basketball player.

Vranes led Skyline High School, in Salt Lake City, to the state basketball championship in his senior year (1977). A 6'7" small forward from the University of Utah, he was selected by the Seattle SuperSonics in the 1st round (5th overall) of the 1981 NBA draft. Vranes played in 7 NBA seasons with the SuperSonics and Philadelphia 76ers from 1981 to 1988.

In his NBA career, Vranes played in 510 games and scored a total of 2,613 points. Perhaps his best year as a professional came during the 1983–84 season as a member of the SuperSonics, appearing in 80 games and averaging 8.4 points per game. On January 18, 1984, Vranes recorded a career high 6 blocks in a 114-107 win over the Dallas Mavericks. Known for his defense, after the 1984–85 season, he was named to the NBA All-Defensive Second Team. That season, on October 26, he recorded 6 steals, along with scoring a team high 24 points, during a 102-94 win over the Utah Jazz.

His single game total of 18 rebounds recorded on April 22, 1983, during a Game 2 loss to the Trail Blazers, are still tied for fourth most rebounds in Thunder/Sonic franchise history.

He played in Europe for AEK BC, Teorematour Arese and Breeze Milano.

His ancestors emigrated to the United States from Croatia in the early 1900s. Vranes is a member of the Church of Jesus Christ of Latter-day Saints. He is a cousin of Jeff Judkins, his teammate at Utah.

References

External links

 
 nba.com historical playerfile

1958 births
Living people
AEK B.C. players
All-American college men's basketball players
American expatriate basketball people in Greece
American expatriate basketball people in Italy
American men's basketball players
American people of Croatian descent
Basketball players at the 1979 Pan American Games
Basketball players from Salt Lake City
Greek Basket League players
Latter Day Saints from Utah
McDonald's High School All-Americans
Medalists at the 1979 Pan American Games
Pallacanestro Varese players
Pan American Games gold medalists for the United States
Pan American Games medalists in basketball
Parade High School All-Americans (boys' basketball)
Philadelphia 76ers players
Seattle SuperSonics draft picks
Seattle SuperSonics players
Small forwards
Utah Utes men's basketball players